Kenneth Breitenbach (January 9, 1955 — April 28, 2017) was a Canadian ice hockey defenceman. He was drafted in the second round, 35th overall, of the 1975 NHL Amateur Draft by the Buffalo Sabres. In his National Hockey League career, which lasted from 1976 to 1979, Breitenbach played in 68 games, all with Buffalo, scoring one goal and adding thirteen assists. He died of cancer in 2017 at the age of 62.

Career statistics

Regular season and playoffs

References

External links
 

1955 births
2017 deaths
Buffalo Sabres draft picks
Buffalo Sabres players
Canadian ice hockey defencemen
Hershey Bears players
Ice hockey people from Ontario
Sportspeople from Welland
St. Catharines Black Hawks players
Toronto Toros draft picks